The Andreotti VII Cabinet was a cabinet of the Italian Republic. It held office from 1991 to 1992.

Initially the executive was also composed of three ministers of the Italian Republican Party (Antonio Maccanico as Minister for Regional Affairs, Adolfo Battaglia as Minister of State Holdings and Giuseppe Galasso as Minister of Cultural Heritage) who however did not take an oath, being the party left by the majority following the non-assignment of the Ministry of Post and Telecommunications.

Andreotti resigned on 24 April 1992.

Party breakdown
 Christian Democracy (DC): Prime Minister, 14 ministers and 38 undersecretaries
 Italian Socialist Party (PSI): Deputy Prime Minister, 10 ministers and 21 undersecretaries
 Italian Republican Party (PRI): 3 ministers and 6 undersecretaries
 Italian Democratic Socialist Party (PSDI): 2 ministers and 5 undersecretaries
 Italian Liberal Party (PLI): 2 ministers and 5 undersecretaries

Composition

|}

References

Andreotti 7 Cabinet
Italian governments
Cabinets established in 1991
Cabinets disestablished in 1992
1991 establishments in Italy
1992 disestablishments in Italy